The FIL European Luge Natural Track Championships 1995 took place in Kandalaksha, Russia.

Men's singles

Women's singles

Panyutina becomes the first non-Austrian or Italian to medal in this event at the championships and the first Russian to do so as well.

Men's doubles

Medal table

References
Men's doubles natural track European champions
Men's singles natural track European champions
Women's singles natural track European champions

FIL European Luge Natural Track Championships
1995 in luge
Luge competitions in Russia
1995 in Russian sport
International sports competitions hosted by Russia